"Sick Cycle Carousel" is a song by American alternative rock band Lifehouse. It is the second single released from their debut studio album No Name Face (2000). The track was written by Lifehouse lead singer Jason Wade and Scott Faircloff, who says he felt freedom when writing songs for the album. American record producers Ron Aniello and Brendan O'Brien produced and mixed the song, respectively. The song was released on April 24, 2001, by DreamWorks Records.

The song received positive reviews from critics, who applauded how the producers brought out Wade's vocals over the instrumentation. It managed to chart on the Billboard Alternative Songs chart at number 21. The track later charted in the Netherlands and New Zealand at number 71 and 47, respectively. An official music video for the song premiered on VH1.com on June 27, 2001, featuring effects to make objects look smaller than they really are.

Background, release and composition

The song was written by Lifehouse lead singer Jason Wade and was produced by American record producer Ron Aniello. When asked about his experience with making songs for No Name Face in an interview with Billboard, Wade said, "DreamWorks has been amazing in letting us make the record. They're super-artist-friendly. They let us make our record the way we wanted to make it. It's the best label we could be on." In an interview with MTV Radio, Wade explained the message behind "Sick Cycle Carousel" and said, "It's one of those songs I'm really afraid to put an explanation to as far as what it's about for me personally. I don't want it to lose its mystery and mystique. Everyone interprets it differently. It's funny hearing people telling what's it's about to them because then I can go, 'Maybe that's what it's about.' It's got a weird mystique to me still." DreamWorks Records released the song to US radio on April 24, 2001.

According to the sheet music published at Musicnotes.com by Sony/ATV Music Publishing, "Sick Cycle Carousel" is set in common time with a moderate tempo of 92 beats per minute. It is composed in the key of A minor with Wade's vocal range spanning from the low-note of C4 to the high-note of G5. The song has a basic chord progression of F–G–Am7–F–G–Am7. John DiBiase of Jesus Freak Hideout called it "a song about the preverbial merry go round we feel like we're on when we keep committing the same sins over and over". Liana Jonas of Allmusic applauded on how Aniello and O'Brien "brought Wade's vocals and lyrics to the forefront of the mix" for all the songs on the album.

Chart performance
"Sick Cycle Carousel" had limited commercial success after the success of Lifehouse's first single, "Hanging by a Moment". The track debuted at number 33 on the Billboard Alternative Songs chart for the week of May 26, 2001. After it spent 12 consecutive weeks on the chart, the song eventually peaked at number 21 for two consecutive weeks. In the Netherlands, the song debuted at number 84 on the Mega Single Top 100 for the week of December 8, 2001, eventually peaking at number 71 after it spent six consecutive weeks on the chart. On the New Zealand Singles Chart, the track debuted at number 50 for the week of August 19, 2001. The song then peaked at number 47 during the week of September 2, 2001, before leaving the chart.

Music video

The music video was filmed in June 2001 at an airplane hangar at Los Angeles International Airport and at a Lifehouse show in London. It was directed by Marcos Siega, who is most notable for his work with Blink-182 and Papa Roach. In an interview with MTV, Wade talked about the idea behind the music video and said, "This is the closest we'll probably ever come to being in a Tim Burton fantasy world. It was done in a real 'Jack and the Beanstalk' style. And Marcos used some camera tricks that make it look amazing. From far away, the stage set looked normal, but when you get closer you get smaller and it gets huge. We were being filmed in front of this bookcase that was like 150 feet high. It's a real visual trip." It premiered on VH1.com on June 27, 2001.

It begins with a shot of Wade's face and the guitar introduction. He then sings the first line of lyrics, which is followed by a transition to a boy lying on a bed shirtless. As the video switches between Wade and the boy, it zooms on the bed frame (which has the same face from the album cover) and opens into another area. The boy is then seen walking around the new area looking around until he goes up nearby stairs. While going up the stairs, the video switches between shots of the boy going up the stairs and Wade singing the lyrics. Once up the stairs, the boy looks around and then walks into a bright light that he sees nearby. He walks through the bright archway into a dark room as the video switches to Lifehouse playing the song. After this, it switches to the boy as he looks up and the camera zooms out to reveal that he is in a giant maze. He then walks back where he came from to find that he is in a house with Lifehouse playing on the television. He then jumps off a window sill and appears tiny as he walks up to a book that is bigger than him. It then transitions to Lifehouse playing the song as the boy gets up on a chair which slowly transcends into his original bed. The video then zooms out on the boy lying on his bed and then switches to the band. It ends with the boy walking into darkness and Wade's face looking on the floor.

Promotion
On January 10, 2001, MTV confirmed that Lifehouse would serve as an opening act on a 14-day tour for Matchbox Twenty, who were promoting their album Mad Season (2000). The tour started February 27, 2001, in Minneapolis and ended on March 29, 2001, in Universal City. In July 2001, Lifehouse went on tour with 3 Doors Down as an opening act on 12 select dates, and performed songs from No Name Face, including "Sick Cycle Carousel". Before they went on tour with 3 Doors Down, the band went on The Tonight Show with Jay Leno on June 25, 2001, and performed "Sick Cycle Carousel".

Track listing
Australian CD single

European CD single

Credits and personnel
Credits and personnel are adapted from Allmusic.
 Songwriting – Jason Wade, Scott Faircloff
 Production – Ron Aniello
 Mixing – Brendan O'Brien
 Engineering – Bob Kearny, Marc Green, Paul Hayden

Charts

Release history

References

External links
 "Sick Cycle Carousel" Music Video on Yahoo! Music

2000 songs
2001 singles
DreamWorks Records singles
Lifehouse (band) songs
Song recordings produced by Ron Aniello
Songs written by Jason Wade